Robert Gamble is the name of:

 Robert D. Gamble, businessman and priest
 Robert J. Gamble, politician
 Robert Gamble House, a building in Florida